Elysium is the thirteenth studio album by power metal band Stratovarius, released on 12 January 2011 through Victor Entertainment (Japan) and on 14 January through Edel AG (worldwide). It is the last Stratovarius album to feature longtime drummer Jörg Michael, who left the band in 2012. Elysium reached No. 1 on the Finnish albums chart, as well as reaching the top 80 in five other countries. "Darkest Hours" was released as a single, reaching No. 4 on the Finnish singles chart.

Overview
The official track listing for Elysium was first announced by keyboardist Jens Johansson on the forum of the band's website on 8 November 2010. The album was released on four different formats: a regular CD; a deluxe Digipak edition CD with a bonus disc containing demos of the entire album; a double-disc collector's edition CD with two bonus tracks on a 7" single; and on vinyl. At a length of 18:07, Elysium'''s title track is by far the longest Stratovarius song to date. The album cover art was created by Gyula Havancsák and features the same star-shaped spacecraft from Polaris'' (2009).

Track listing

Personnel

Stratovarius
Timo Kotipelto – lead vocals
Matias Kupiainen – guitar, keyboard programming, engineering, mixing (tracks 3, 4, 8, 9), production
Jens Johansson – keyboard
Jörg Michael – drums
Lauri Porra – bass, keyboard programming

Additional credits
Risto Kupiainen – keyboard programming, orchestral arrangement (track 3, 10), orchestral programming (tracks 1, 3, 10), choir programming (tracks 4, 9)
Perttu Vänskä – orchestral arrangement (tracks 1, 2, 4, 9), orchestral programming (tracks 2, 4, 9), engineering, editing
Arzka Sievälä – choir
Jani Liimatainen – choir
Aleksi Parviainen – choir
Tipe Johnson – choir
Anssi Stenberg – choir
Marko "Hepa" Waara – choir
Kalle Keski-Orvola – engineering, editing
Santtu Lehtiniemi – engineering (guitar)
Mikko Karmila – mixing (tracks 1, 2, 5–7)
Svante Försback – mastering

Chart performance

Album

Singles

References

External links
Elysium at stratovarius.com

See also
List of number-one albums of 2011 (Finland)

Stratovarius albums
2011 albums
Victor Entertainment albums
Edel AG albums